Mom's Touch, is a chicken burger chain based in South Korea. As of 2020, the chain had over 1,314 retail stores in South Korea. The company's name comes from the thought that their food is made the same way a mother would make for her family.

History 
Mom's Touch was established in 1997 in Seoul. After that, in order to restructure, CEO Chung Hyun-sik took over Mom's Touch in 2004 on condition that it took on a deficit and spun it off into Haemaro Food Service. It did not make operating profit from 2004 to 2010. It recorded $2.6 billion (26 billion KRW) in operating profit in 2013 and made its first profit for the first time. On November 5, 2019, Haemaro Food Service, which runs Mom's Touch, was sold to private equity fund KL & Partners for 7.3 billion won. On January 1, 2018, Mom's Touch opened its first American store in Concord, California.

Products 
Mom's Touch main products are fried chicken wings, chicken burgers, and hamburgers. The fried chicken wings come in a variety of flavors such as spicy, chili pepper, honey, garlic, onion cheese, and curry. The chicken burger types include white garlic, chicken thigh burger, chicken filet burger, ham and cheese, jalapeno chicken burger, Cajun mango burger, and spicy chicken burger. The hamburger types include bulgogi burger, spicy bulgogi burger, and Jr. Burger. Mom's Touch also does not use trans fat oils or monosodium glutamate in their products. Sides available include french fries, Yakimandu, fried shrimp, salads, and chicken wraps.

Advertising 
Mom's Touch advertising has predominantly relied on comedic television commercials. One commercial shows the small amount of food given by other companies then goes on to show how much bigger Mom's Touch portion sizes are.

They also were seen in some webtoons, notably Lookism, where many restaurants were drawn by Park Tae-jun.

References

External links
 

South Korean brands
Fast-food chains of South Korea
Fast-food hamburger restaurants